Shelbridge is a historic three-story mansion in Johnson City, Tennessee, U.S.. It serves as the official residence of the president of East Tennessee State University.

History
The house was built in 1920-1921 for Ross Spears, a businessman. In 1928, it was acquired by Henry P. Bridges, a businessman. Bridges renamed it Shelbridge after his wife, Shelby.

In the 1970s, the house was donated to East Tennessee State University, and it became the president's house. The first president to live in the house was D.P. Culp; the family moved in 1973. Six presidents have occupied the estate since. It is now home to current ETSU President Brian Noland.

Architectural significance
The house was designed by architect D. R. Beeson in the Colonial Revival style. It has been listed on the National Register of Historic Places since December 14, 1995.

References

National Register of Historic Places in Washington County, Tennessee
Colonial Revival architecture in Tennessee
Houses completed in 1920
East Tennessee State University